Syzygium microphyllum is a species of plant in the family Myrtaceae. It is endemic to India.  It is threatened by habitat loss. In 1998 the now disputed taxon Syzygium gambleanum was listed as extinct in the IUCN Red List. However, after research work by the Royal Botanic Gardens Kew this plant was revealed as identical with Syzygium microphyllum and so the name Syzygium gambleanum became an illegitimate synonym.

References

Flora of India (region)
microphyllum
Endangered plants
Taxonomy articles created by Polbot